Daniel Höner is a Swiss former competitive figure skater. Representing EC Zürich, he won seven consecutive Swiss national titles from 1967 to 1973. He placed in the top ten at three European Championships – in 1970 (Leningrad), 1972 (Gothenburg), and 1973 (Cologne). His best world result, 11th, came at the 1973 World Championships in Bratislava.

Höner coaches at Eissport Club Zürich-Oerlikon.

Competitive highlights

References 

Swiss male single skaters
Living people
Figure skaters from Zürich
1953 births